Evgheniya Miroshnichenko (June 12, 1931 – April 27, 2009) was a Soviet and Ukrainian opera and chamber singer, internationally famous for her coloratura soprano voice. She was the People's Artist of the USSR in 1965.

Life and career
Miroshnichenko was born in a working-class family in Radyanske, a small village in the Vovchansk Raion, Kharkiv Oblast (now called Hrafske and part of Chuhuiv Raion). Prior to the Russian Revolution her mother, Susanna (1903–1979), used to sing for Count Gendrikov’s theater; her father, Semen (1899–1943), was a mechanic and a driver. Semen was a member of tank crew during World War II and was killed during a combat. Because of World War II, Miroshnichenko did not finish her primary school education, and in 1943 she became a student of a vocational school in Kharkiv where she started to sing in a choir. While at school she took an active part in amateur theatre. During an amateur singing show in Moscow in 1951, she was noticed by a professor of the Kiev Conservatory, who invited her to study at the conservatory under Professor M. Donec-Tessair. Because of her poor progress in non-musical subjects she failed, but was later re-admitted. She finished at the Kiev Conservatory in 1957 and made her debut in the Kiev Opera Theater, as Violetta in Giuseppe Verdi's opera La traviata. In 1961 Miroshnichenko worked in Milan in La Scala under the direction of Elvira de Hidalgo.

Miroshnichenko's voice was unique in its timbre and vocal range. She was called "the singer everyone must see" on account of her vocal technique and her talent for dramatic acting. She was a lead singer of the Kiev Opera Theater from 1957 to 1998. Miroshnichenko took part in many international and national competitions, acted in musical films, recorded discs, and gave performances in tours across the United States, Canada and Western Europe.

In 1980, Miroshnichenko became a teacher at the Kiev Conservatory, and 1990 she became Professor of Vocal Studies there. Many of her students became well-known opera singers in Ukraine and worldwide. Miroshnichenko lived in Kiev, and was involved with charities and teaching, founding the International Charitable Organizations that helped establish the Small Opera Theater in Kiev.

Personal life
Miroshnichenko had two sons, Igor Shkolniy (born 1962) and Oleg Miroshnichenko (born 1964), and three grandchildren, Evgeniya Shkolna (born 1985), Anton Miroshnichenko (born 1986) and Vyacheslav Shkolniy (born 1987).

Prizes and honours
International Vocalist contest in Toulouse (1958, the second prize)
World Youth Festival in Moscow (1957, a silver medalist)
National Artist of the USSR
Taras Shevchenko State prize of Ukrainian SSR (1972)
State prize of the USSR (1981)
National Hero of Ukraine (2006)
Freeman of Kharkiv
Honorary Award of the President of Ukraine
Honorary Award of Yaroslav Mudriy (2001)

References

 “Miroshnichenko Evgheniya Semenovna”, Leaders of Ukraine,  (accessed February 12, 2009)
 About the designation of the name of Hero of Ukraine to E. Miroshnichenko. Law portal of Ukraine.  (accessed February 12, 2009)
 “Miroshnichenko Evgheniya Semenovna”, Visual dictionary,   (accessed February 12, 2009)
“Evgheniya Miroshnichenko”, Umka.com.ua,  (accessed February 12, 2009)
“Miroshnichenko Evgheniya Semenovna”, Ukrainian song,  (accessed February 12, 2009)

External links
Photo: “Miroshnichenko Evgheniya Semenovna”, Ukrainian song,  (accessed February 12, 2009)

1931 births
2009 deaths
People from Kharkiv Oblast
20th-century Ukrainian women opera singers
Ukrainian operatic sopranos
Recipients of the title of Hero of Ukraine
Burials at Baikove Cemetery